This article details the qualifying phase for modern pentathlon at the 2020 Summer Olympics . Thirty-six athletes per male and female gender must qualify for the Games, with only a maximum of two each per NOC. Qualification methods are similarly applied to both men's and women's events.

Host nation Japan has been guaranteed one quota place automatically, while two invitational positions are distributed by the UIPM once the rest of the qualifiers are announced and thereby decided.

The initial distribution of berths to the athletes based on competition results occur between February and September 2019. One place will be handily awarded to the winner of the 2019 UIPM World Cup final. Twenty places are determined by the continental championships: one each from Africa and Oceania, five from Asia, eight from Europe, and five from the Americas with a maximum of one quota per NOC (two winners each from NORCECA and South America, and the highest-ranked from the 2019 Pan American Games in Lima, Peru).

Three places have been reserved to the highest-ranked athletes at each of the 2019 and 2020 UIPM World Championships. The remaining six will be awarded based on the pentathlon's world rankings, unless a reallocation of unused berths have been invoked before the deadline.

Qualification summary

Men's
Individual athletes may qualify in any of the following methods, ensuring that an NOC may enter up to a maximum of two in each event. If more than two athletes are eligible to compete, a non-selected quota has been redistributed.

Women's
Individual athletes may qualify in any of the following methods, ensuring that an NOC may enter up to a maximum of two in each event. If more than two athletes are eligible to compete, a non-selected quota has been redistributed.

Notelist

References

Qualification
Qualification for the 2020 Summer Olympics